Jamaan Al-Dossari (Arabic: جمعان الدوسري; born 19 June 1987, in Riyadh) is a Saudi football player who currently plays for Al-Waseel as a defender. He joined the club in 2014 from Al-Riyadh.

References

Saudi Arabian footballers
1987 births
Living people
Association football defenders
Al-Riyadh SC players
Al Nassr FC players
Ettifaq FC players
Al-Shabab FC (Riyadh) players
Al-Shoulla FC players
Al-Waseel FC players
Sportspeople from Riyadh
Saudi First Division League players
Saudi Professional League players
Saudi Third Division players